El Paraíso, Honduras may refer to:

El Paraíso Department
El Paraíso, El Paraíso
El Paraíso, Copán